Benson Mbai Itwiku is a Kenyan politician. He belongs to the Orange Democratic Movement-Kenya and has represented the Masinga Constituency in the National Assembly of Kenya since the Kenyan parliamentary election of 2007.

References

Living people
Year of birth missing (living people)
Wiper Democratic Movement – Kenya politicians
Members of the National Assembly (Kenya)